Transcription factor E2F4 is a protein that in humans is encoded by the E2F4 gene.

Function 

The protein encoded by this gene is a member of the E2F family of transcription factors. The E2F family plays a crucial role in the control of cell cycle and action of tumor suppressor proteins and is also a target of the transforming proteins of small DNA tumor viruses.  This protein binds to all three of the  tumor suppressor proteins pRB, p107 and p130, but with higher affinity to the last two. It plays an important role in the suppression of proliferation-associated genes, and its gene mutation and increased expression may be associated with human cancer.

Structure 

The E2F proteins contain several evolutionally conserved domains found in most members of the family. These domains include a DNA binding domain, a dimerization domain which determines interaction with the differentiation regulated transcription factor proteins (DP), a transactivation domain enriched in acidic amino acids (Asp + Glu), and a tumor suppressor protein association domain which is embedded within the transactivation domain.

Interactions
E2F4 has been shown to interact with Smad3.

See also
 E2F

References

Further reading

External links 
 
 
 PDBe-KB provides an overview of all the structure information available in the PDB for Human Transcription factor E2F4

Transcription factors